Donald Bruce Gillies (October 15, 1928 – July 17, 1975) was a Canadian computer scientist and mathematician who worked in the fields of computer design, game theory, and minicomputer programming environments.

Early life and education 
Donald B. Gillies was born in Toronto, Ontario, Canada, to John Zachariah Gillies (a Canadian) and Anne Isabelle Douglas MacQueen (an American). He attended the University of Toronto Schools, a laboratory school originally affiliated with the University. Gillies attended the University of Toronto from 1946 to 1950, majoring in Mathematics.

He began his college education at the University of Illinois and helped with the checkout of Illiac I computer in the summer of 1951.  He then transferred to Princeton to work for John von Neumann and developed the first theorems of core (game theory) in his PhD thesis.

Gillies ranked among the top ten participants in the William Lowell Putnam Mathematical Competition held in 1950.

Career 
Gillies moved to England for two years to work for the National Research Development Corporation. He returned to the US in 1956, married Alice E. Dunkle, and began a job as a professor at the University of Illinois at Urbana-Champaign.

Gillies found three new Mersenne primes, one of which was the largest prime number known at the time.

Death and legacy 
Gillies died unexpectedly at age 46 on July 17, 1975, of a rare viral myocarditis.

In 1975, the Donald B. Gillies Memorial lecture was established at the University of Illinois, with one leading researcher from computer science appearing every year.  The first lecturer was Alan Perlis.

In 2006, the Donald B. Gillies Chair Professorship was established in the Department of Computer Science at the University of Illinois. Vikram Adve was invested as the second chair professor of the endowment in 2018. The Department of Computer Science awarded a Memorial Achievement Award to Gillies in 2011.

See also 
History of computing
Largest known prime number

References

External links 

 Donald B. Gillies Memorial Lecture (UIUC CS Dept.), Donald B. Gillies Memorial Lecture (UIUC Math Dept.)
University of Illinois Computing Timeline
At the dawn of the space age (UIUC Astronomy Dept.)
Sputnik's Secret History Finally Revealed (AP via FOX News, October 1, 2007)
Mersenne Primes History, Theorems and Lists
Donald B. Gillies chair professorship at the University of Illinois at Urbana-Champaign
Five Mathematics PhDs granted by Donald B. Gillies, 1965-1973
 Donald B. Gillies, Three New Mersenne Primes and a Statistical Theory, Mathematics of Comput., Vol. 18:85 (Jan. 1964), pp. 93-97.
   Ian Stocks and Jayant Krishnaswamy, On a transportable high level language for minicomputers, ACM SIGMINI/SIGPLAN Conference, March 1976
On a transportable high level language for minicomputers

1928 births
1975 deaths
Canadian computer scientists
Computer designers
Game theorists
Scientists from Toronto
Princeton University alumni
University of Toronto alumni
University of Illinois Urbana-Champaign alumni
University of Illinois Urbana-Champaign faculty
20th-century Canadian  mathematicians